Azorella diapensioides is a species of flowering plant in the genus Azorella found in Peru and Bolivia.

References

diapensioides